Argozelo is a civil parish in the municipality of Vimioso, Portugal. The population in 2011 was 701, in an area of 29.53 km².

References

Freguesias of Vimioso